The Mark Levinson ML-3 was a 200 watt per channel dual monaural Class AB2 power amplifier that used toroidal transformers. Produced between 1979 and 1987, the ML-3 consisted of two electrically separate amplifiers in one chassis, hence the name "Dual Monaural". It also featured discrete circuit construction; no integrated circuits were incorporated to keep the signal pure. The design was by Thomas P. Colangelo.

The ML-3 constituted the archetype of an American highend, highpower amplifier.

Specifications

200 W/channel at 8 ohms, 400 W/ch at 4 ohms, 800 W/ch at 2 ohms
Maximum output: 45 volts 30 amperes
Two 1.2 kVA Avel Lindbergh toroidal transformers, 4 Sprague 36,000 µF, 100 V capacitors and 40 output devices (20 per channel)
Range: 20 Hz to 20 kHz with less than 0.2% total harmonic distortion
Gold-plated CAMAC input connectors
Adjustable AC voltage: No, factory set
Adjustable output damping toggle switches (one per channel) (in later models only)
Weight: 116 lb (56 kg)

External links
 Mark Levinson Equipment History

References

Audio amplifiers